Teltow Stadt (town) station is located about  east of the centre of Teltow in the German state Brandenburg to the south of Berlin on the Berlin-Lichterfelde Süd–Teltow Stadt railway. The line and the station were opened on 24 February 2005. It has two tracks next to an island platform and is located in a cutting. Mahlower Straße crosses over it on a bridge. Stairs and a lift connect the station to the street. Although the town of Teltow is in the Potsdam-Mittelmark district, the station is in the adjoining Teltow-Fläming district.

Train services
Since the opening of the line, the line has been served at 20-minute intervals. In July 2011, services during the day were increased to 10-minute intervals. As a result, and because the regional bus network decided to coordinate with the S-Bahn timetable, the number of weekday passengers increased from 3,200 in 2008 to 7,000 in 2012.
 	
Bus stops are located immediately next to the entrances. There are public routes to, inter alia, Potsdam, Stahnsdorf, Ludwigsfelde, Blankenfelde, Mahlow and to the centre of Berlin. Furthermore, there is a car park directly north of the station.

References

Teltow Stadt
Railway stations in Brandenburg
Buildings and structures in Potsdam-Mittelmark
Railway stations in Germany opened in 2005